Samuel Ward Francis (December 26, 1835 – March 25, 1886) was an American writer, inventor, and physician from New York. Among his inventions was an early typewriter.

Bibliography
 Inside Out, a Curious Book by a Singular Man 
 Life and Death (1870)

References

1835 births
1886 deaths